Agailjhara is an upazila (sub-district) of southern Bangladesh's Barisal District, part of the Barisal Division.

Geography
Agailjhara Upazila covers 155.47 km2. It is located between 22°54' and 23°03' north and between 90°03' and 90°13' east. It is bordered by Gournadi Upazila to the northeast, Wazirpur Upazila to the south, and Kotalipara Upazila to the west.

History
Agailjhara was formerly part of Gournadi. In the 16th century, the Faujdar of Bakla Sabi Khan settled in the village of Gaila with members of the Mughal Army. In 1921, a historic farmers convention was held in Agailjhara High English School presided by Khan Bahadur Hasem Ali Khan and advised by A. K. Fazlul Huq. During the Bangladesh Liberation War of 1971, 8 people were murdered in the village of Kodaldhoa. A thana (police station headquarters) was formed in Agailjhara on 16 June 1981. The status of Agailjhara Thana was upgraded to upazila (sub-district) on 7 November 1983 as part of the President of Bangladesh Hussain Muhammad Ershad's decentralisation programme.

Demographics
According to the 1991 Bangladesh census, Agailjhara had a population of 147,343 distributed among 30,560 households. 50.93% of the population was male, and 49.07% was female. There were 76,524 people aged 18 or over. Agailjhara had an average literacy rate of 42.4% (7+ years schooling), compared to the national average of 32.4%.

In the 2001 Bangladesh census, Agailjhara had a total population of 155,661 whereby males accounted for 50.23% (78,193) of the community, while 49.76% (77,468) were women. The population reduced in the 2011 Bangladesh census registering 149,456 total residents.

Religion
Islam is the predominant religion with 82,720 people identifying as Muslims, 63175 as Hindus, 3553 as Christians and 8 people worshipping other faiths. Agailjhara Upazila has the highest percentage share of Hindus among the 10 upazilas of Barisal district but both the absolute numbers and the share of population has decreased since 1981.

Administration
Agailjhara formed as a thana on 16 June 1981 and became an upazila on 7 November 1983.

Agailjhara Upazila is divided into five union parishads: Bagdha, Bakal, Gaila, Rajiher, and Ratanpur. The union parishads are subdivided into 78 mauzas and 96 villages.

Education
Agailjhara is home to many notable schools, including Shaheed Abdur Rob Serniabat Degree College, Askar Kalibari Secondary School and College (established in 1943), Goila High School (1893), and B. H. P. Academy (1919).

Secondary schools
List of secondary schools in Agailjhara Upazila:
 Agailjhara Bhegai Halder Public Academy 
 Agailjhara Sreemalati Matree Mangal Girls High School
 Askar Kalibari Secondary School & College
 Bagdha Secondary School and College
 Bahadurpur High School
 Bakal Niranjan Bairagi High School
 Barapaika Secondary School
 Basail Secondary School
 Batra Premchand Girls High School
 Chhoygram Secondary School
 Dumuria Secondary school
 Goila secondary School
 Jamina Mohammed Secondary School
 Jobarpar Secondary School
 Kagasura Secondary School
 Kathira Adarsha Biddya Niketon
 Kodaldhoa Secondary School
 Mollapara High School
 Naghirpar Secondary School
 Paisa High School
 Rajihar Secondary School
 Ramananderak High School
 Rangta Secondary School
 Ratnopur Secondary School 
 Sheral Ml. High School
 Temar Maleka Khatun Girls High School
 Ulania Coronation High School
 Adarsha High School & College
 Valukshi High School

Non-profit organizations 
Payra Social Welfare

Notable people
Abul Hasanat Abdullah, parliamentarian
Sabih Khan, 17th-century Faujdar of Bakla

See also
Upazilas of Bangladesh
Districts of Bangladesh
Divisions of Bangladesh

References

Upazilas of Barisal District
Barishal Division